Memórias, Crônicas e Declarações de Amor is an album by Brazilian singer Marisa Monte, released in 2000.  Its featured song include "Amor I Love You".  It reached number one in Brasil Hot 100 Airplay ranking.  It was followed by a DVD of the same name, released in 2000, featuring her performances at the ATL Hall, in Rio de Janeiro, over three nights.

Track listing 
 "Amor I Love You" (Marisa Monte/Carlinhos Brown)
 "Não Vá Embora" (Monte/Arnaldo Antunes)
 "O Que Me Importa" (Cury)
 "Não é Fácil" (Monte/Brown/Antunes)
 "Perdão Você" (Brown/Alaim Tavares)
 "Tema de Amor" (Monte/Brown)
 "Abololô" (Monte/Lucas Santtana)
 "Para Ver as Meninas" (Paulinho da Viola)
 "Cinco Minutos" (Jorge Ben)
 "Gentileza" (Monte)
 "Água Também é Mar" (Monte/Brown/Antunes)
 "Gotas de Luar" (Nelson Cavaquinho/Guilherme de Brito)
 "Sou Seu Sabiá" (Caetano Veloso)

Charts

Year-end charts

Notes

Marisa Monte albums
2000 albums